Little Mama (born between 1937 and 1942, died on November 14, 2017) was a chimpanzee at Lion Country Safari in Loxahatchee (near West Palm Beach) in Palm Beach County, Florida. Her age was estimated at between 30 and 35 by primatologist Jane Goodall in 1972, and the Safari settled on February 14, 1938, as her birth date for commemorative purposes. She arrived at the Safari in 1967, after having spent time performing as an ice skater, possibly in the Ice Capades.

While chimpanzees have an average lifespan of 60 years, Little Mama was thought to be in her late 70s when she died in 2017 and was considered the oldest on record.

See also 
 Oldest hominoids
 List of individual apes

References 

Individual primates in the United States
Individual chimpanzees
1938 animal births
2017 animal deaths